Nick Leason (born 23 August 1968 in Purley, London) is a British racing driver.

Career
In 2007, Leason drove in the British Touring Car Championship. Leason had initially planned to compete in the Daniels Motorsport-run Vauxhall Astra Coupe he had raced in the two final rounds of the 2006 season. However, this project was abandoned during pre-season and Leason was instead confirmed as a driver for BTC Racing in a Lexus teamed with Chris Stockton. He did not race at Croft that year and after persistent reliability troubles he decided to abort his full season campaign. Leason achieved a final championship position of 24th.

In 2008, Leason announced that he planned to join up with Rick Kerry and Team AFM Racing to race a pair of diesel fuelled BMW 120ds, though the team missed the whole season.

Leason did eventually race the diesel powered BMW 120d in the opening four rounds of the 2009 BTCC but withdrew due to lack of budget.

Race career
2009 – AFM Motorsport. BMW 120D. No. 16
2007 – BTC Racing. Lexus IS200. No. 19.
2006 – Final two BTCC meetings of the season. Team NJL Racing with Daniels Motorsport. Vauxhall Astra Coupe. No. 19
2005 – Seat Cupra Championship
2004 – Test driver BTCC Ford Focus Project
2003 – Test driver
2002 – Lamborghini Supertrophy – 3rd in class points, 6th overall
2001 – Ford Fiesta Zetec Championship
2000 – Proton Coupe Cup
1999 – Proton Coupe Cup
1998 – Fiesta XR2 Challenge and Stock Hatch Championship
1997 – Stock Hatch Championship – 9th in points (Ford Fiesta XR2)
1996 – Fiesta XR2 Challenge
1995 – Ford Credit Fiesta Championship testing
1994 – Ford Credit Fiesta Championship testing

Racing record

Complete British Touring Car Championship results
(key) (Races in bold indicate pole position – 1 point awarded in first race) (Races in italics indicate fastest lap – 1 point awarded all races) (* signifies that driver lead race for at least one lap – 1 point awarded all races)

References

External links
Home page
BTCC Profile page

1968 births
Living people
English racing drivers
British Touring Car Championship drivers
People from Purley, London
Porsche Carrera Cup GB drivers